The 2010 Melbourne Storm season was the 13th in the club's history and competed in the NRL's 2010 Telstra Premiership. After winning the first four games of the season, Storm's season would hit a significant challenge after Round 6 when the NRL penalised the club for salary cap breaches with the team unable to play for points for the remainder of the season. These revelations also saw them stripped of the 2007 and 2009 Premierships and the 2006, 2007 and 2008 minor premiership titles.

Craig Bellamy and the players maintained an incredible focus to win 14 games for the year, the same number they achieved the previous season. That would have been enough to see them finish in fifth spot on the ladder. This season remains the only time Storm have missed the finals in the Bellamy era.

Greg Inglis scored 11 tries to finish as the team's leading try scorer in his final year at Storm. Other notable players to leave included Brett White, Ryan Hoffman, Brett Finch, Jeff Lima and Aiden Tolman. However, there were several highlights during the season with youngsters Jesse Bromwich, Matthew Duffie, Luke Kelly, Rory Kostjasyn, Justin O’Neill and Gareth Widdop all bursting on the scene.

Storm also played their first ever game at AAMI Park in Round 9. Ryan Hinchcliffe was named Storm's player of the year while Ron Gauci was installed as Storm CEO midway through the difficult season and set about rebuilding the Club over the next several seasons. Craig Bellamy continues to be highly regarded for the way he led the Club throughout 2010 and had this to say when summing up the season.

"When we found out it was obviously devastating and the year has been a drawn-out and difficult one ever since. But we stayed competitive, we unearthed some good kids and we conducted ourselves with dignity. For that I’m proud of the boys. It’s sad to see guys go especially given the massive contribution they have had to this club". - Craig Bellamy

Season summary 
 11 January – Matt Hanson is appointed club CEO, replacing Brian Waldron who had been in the role since 2005.
 21 February – Melbourne begin their UK Tour with a victory over Harlequins RL at The Stoop, winning 34-10 with Dane Nielsen scoring a double.
 World Club Challenge – Melbourne defeat Leeds Rhinos 18-10 in the 2010 World Club Challenge held at Elland Road, the club's second triumph in the fixture. Played in torrential rain, the scores were locked at 4-all at half time, with no tries scored. Storm captain Cameron Smith who started the match at halfback, was announced as player of the match.
 Round 1 – Luke MacDougall scores a try in his club debut, his first NRL game since June 2007, as Melbourne start the season with a 14-10 win over Cronulla. It is the club's seventh straight Round 1 victory under Craig Bellamy.
 Round 2 – Behind 14-0 after 22 minutes, Melbourne come back to defeat Newcastle Knights 20-14.
 Round 3 – Returning from a hip injury, Cooper Cronk made an instant impact from the bench setting up a try and pulling off a 40-20 kick to help Melbourne to a 16-10 win over Penrith Panthers in Greg Inglis's 100th NRL game.
 March 27 – Allegations of a salary cap breach are levelled at the club as Cameron Smith takes up a promotional and commentary contract with Fox Sports, speculation about the legality of the deal lingering with both the club and Fox Sports owned by News Limited.
 Round 4 – In the club's first game of the season held in Victoria, Melbourne extended their undefeated start to the season with a 17-4 win over St George Illawarra Dragons, in front of a crowd of 25,480 a regular season record for games played in Victoria. Played on Good Friday, the club would raise $50,000 towards the Good Friday Appeal. After four rounds of the 2010 NRL season Melbourne would sit on top of the ladder as the only undefeated team. 
 Round 5 – A handful of controversial refereeing decisions sees Gold Coast Titans hand Melbourne their first defeat of the season, coming from 16-4 down to win 20-16. Anthony Quinn's hat trick of tries not enough to secure victory.
 12 April – Greg Inglis escapes conviction on assault charges following an incident with his girlfriend Sally Robinson in August 2009. Inglis was ordered to complete a diversion order after accepting responsibility for his actions. Inglis was stood down for a short period at the time of the incident in 2009.
 Round 6 – Down 16-0 after only 16 minutes in Monday night football, Melbourne fall short 18-16 against Manly to lose their second successive game.
 22 April – See salary cap scandal section.
 Round 7 – Just three days after the salary cap scandal news broke and the punishments announced, Melbourne players high on passion and emotion thrash the New Zealand Warriors 40-6 at Etihad Stadium. Rookie Matt Duffie scores two tries on his NRL debut, with Cameron Smith quoted "we had a lot to get through this week, sitting at home not knowing how we are going to feel tonight... I can say it's the proudest moment of all our careers."
 Round 9 – In the first NRL game at the new $267m AAMI Park venue, Storm lose 36-14 despite Anthony Quinn scoring the first try at the ground. Playing without Cameron Smith, Melbourne looked flat as former Storm player Israel Folau scored two tries.
 13 May – An injury suffered by Anthony Quinn in the match against Brisbane is found to be more serious, with the er to be sidelined for over a month after surgery.
 Round 10 – Amidst chaotic scenes in the crowd as angry Canberra Raiders fans waved $10 and $20 notes over the fence at Melbourne players, the Storm beat the original 1990s salary cap cheating club Canberra 17-6 on the back of a hat trick of tries to Greg Inglis.
 18 May – Aiden Tolman becomes the first player to be forced out of the club after the salary cap punishments, signing a 3-year contract with Canterbury from 2011.
 27 May – Melbourne players secure a deal with club sponsors who agree to donate money to different charities every week. The program is launched as "Points with a Purpose" with each game having a different charity as beneficiary of a donation for each point scored by the team.
 Round 12 – Melbourne win their first game at AAMI Park, defeating 2002 salary cap cheating club Canterbury 23-12 after leading 23-0 at half time.
 4 June – The Thunderbolts snap an 8-game winless streak in the 2010 Toyota Cup season, with the reigning premiers defeating Parramatta.
 Round 13 – In a spiteful rematch of the 2009 NRL Grand Final, future salary cap cheating club Parramatta defeat Melbourne 24-10 amidst tense scenes. Billy Slater was sin binned after retaliating to a Jarryd Hayne head-butt.
 12 June – Ryan Tandy is given an immediate release by the club, with the forward immediately joining Canterbury for the remainder of the season.
 Round 14 – Missing a bunch of Queensland Origin players, and captained for the first and only time by Adam Blair, Melbourne are beaten by Sydney Roosters 38-6 to score the visitors first victory in Melbourne since 2004.
 Round 15 – A hat-trick to Justin O'Neill and doubles to Matt Duffie and Billy Slater help Melbourne raise plenty of money for charity in a 58-12 thrashing of North Queensland Cowboys.
 Round 16 – South Sydney Rabbitohs score their first victory over Melbourne since 2004, winning a close 16-14 contest in Perth.
 Round 18 – In the club's first game at the Adelaide Oval, and first game in South Australia since 2006, Melbourne go down 20-18 to Canterbury.
 14 July – Big-name Melbourne players Cameron Smith, Billy Slater, Greg Inglis and Cooper Cronk are reported to have approached Storm officials offering to take pay cuts to help the club retain them and field a team under the National Rugby League salary cap in 2011.
 15 July – The findings of the News Limited commissioned report by Deloitte into the salary cap breach are released by News Limited chairman and CEO John Hartigan. In anticipation of the release of the report, News Limited sacks the club's independent board members, with acting-CEO Frank Stanton in charge of the club with the board now consisting of only News Limited executives. See salary cap scandal section.
 Round 19 – Melbourne suffer their third-straight defeat, the longest streak under Craig Bellamy, losing the Michael Moore Trophy to the Warriors 13-6 in Auckland.
 19 July – Ryan Hoffman, Jeff Lima, and Brett Finch are all announced as leaving Melbourne at the end of the season, with all three players joining Wigan Warriors.
 21 July – Ron Gauci is appointed as new club CEO, replacing acting-CEO Frank Stanton.
 Round 20 – Storm snap their losing streak, ending a mid-season slump with a 18-10 win over Penrith Panthers.
 10 August – Greg Inglis (Brisbane) and Brett White (Canberra) are confirmed as the latest departures from the club as Melbourne submit their contract lists to the NRL for 2011. Inglis would later end up at South Sydney after his release from his Storm contract caused issues, with Brisbane eventually withdrawing their contract offer after Inglis failed to report to preseason training in November 2010.
 Round 23 – Two tries to Ryan Hinchcliffe helped Melbourne to a 18-16 win over South Sydney, extending the Rabbitohs' winless streak in Victoria.
 2 September – NRL CEO David Gallop belatedly visits Melbourne to speak to the Storm players for the first time since handing down the salary cap breach punishments. With the meeting described as "respectful."
 Round 26 – For its final match of the season, the club sold single tickets for $1 as a thank-you gesture to the club's supporters after what had been a difficult season. Bidding farewell to a bunch of departing players, Melbourne score a comfortable 34-4 victory over Newcastle. Departing players Greg Inglis (2 tries), Ryan Hoffman, Brett White, and Aiden Tolman all scoring tries, with Jeff Lima scoring the first goal of his career. Melbourne's final 14-10 win-loss record for the season would have seen them finish fifth on the NRL ladder if they were able to accrue points. 
 6 October – Melbourne Storm assistant coach Stephen Kearney is appointed head coach of the Parramatta Eels.
 18 October – NRL Judiciary chairman Greg Woods and panel members Royce Ayliffe and Darrell Williams settle their defamation action against Craig Bellamy and former Storm CEO Brian Waldron. The case came from comments made after the 2008 suspension of Cameron Smith during the finals. It is reported that Bellamy and Waldron would pay a total of $105,000 and meet legal costs in excess of $100,000.
 30 November – The club announces the end of their reserve grade program in the NSW Cup, announcing new feeder club agreements. Reserve players will be sent to either Easts Tigers to play in the Queensland Cup, or to play in NSW Cup in a combined side with Cronulla-Sutherland Sharks.

Salary cap scandal

On 22 April 2010, the Melbourne Storm were stripped of their titles of 2007 and 2009 premierships and their 2006, 2007 and 2008 minor premierships following an alleged insider tip-off to the NRL auditing body that the club had not been complying with the NRL salary cap. The club had a long-term system of keeping two sets of books, one set displaying players incomes' complying with the NRL salary cap and another hidden set in a separate room disclosing the true player payments. Following evidence of salary cap breaches, Melbourne were also fined a record $1,689,000, deducted all eight premiership points received in the season and barred from receiving any further premiership points (including those for the two byes) for the rest of the season, guaranteeing them zero points and the wooden spoon for 2010.

On 24 April coach Craig Bellamy publicly announced that he vowed to rebuild the shattered club, and welcomed the NRL's investigation into the salary cap rorting before a training session with the team which was watched by thousands of cheering supporters.

Players were still allowed to play Test and/or State of Origin matches and for some of those players it did not affect Queensland's bid for a fifth straight Origin series victory. Later in the season the Storm were also stripped of the 2010 World Club Challenge title, and Cameron Smith was stripped of his Man of the Match award as well. The team's under-20s team was not affected.

Milestone games

Melbourne Storm 2010 season crowd averages

Fixtures

Pre Season

Regular season - Rounds 1 to 12
During the regular season, the Storm will play their first three home games at Etihad Stadium before moving to their new purpose built and permanent home AAMI Park.

Regular season - Rounds 13 - 26

Ladder

2010 Coaching Staff
 Head coach: Craig Bellamy
 Assistant coaches: Brad Arthur & Stephen Kearney
 Strength and conditioning Coach: Alex Corvo
 Football Manager: Frank Ponissi
 NRL Under 20s Coach: Dean Pay
 NSW Cup Coach: Tony Adam

2010 squad

Player movements

Losses
 Brett Anderson to Released
 Scott Anderson to Brisbane Broncos
 Matthew Cross to Manly Warringah Sea Eagles
 Dallas Johnson to Catalans Dragons
 James Maloney to New Zealand Warriors
 Ryan Tandy to Canterbury-Bankstown Bulldogs (midseason)
 Joseph Tomane to Gold Coast Titans
 Steve Turner to Canterbury-Bankstown Bulldogs
 Wairangi Koopu to Retirement

Gains
 Sione Kite from Canterbury-Bankstown Bulldogs
 Todd Lowrie from Parramatta Eels
 Luke MacDougall from Newcastle Knights
 Bryan Norrie from Cronulla-Sutherland Sharks
 Chase Stanley from St George Illawarra Dragons

Representative honours
This table lists all players who have played a representative match in 2010.

Reserve grade
For the first time in club history, a reserve grade team played as Melbourne Storm, with the club entering a team into the New South Wales Cup competition. 
Coached by former Canberra Raiders 2008 Toyota Cup winning coach, Tony Adam, Melbourne finished in seventh position on the ladder (out of 12 teams) qualifying for the finals series. They were eliminated by Balmain Ryde-Eastwood Tigers in the first week of the finals, defeated 48-18.
This was the only season that Melbourne fielded a reserve grade team under their own brand.

S. G. Ball Cup
For the second consecutive season, Melbourne entered a junior representative team in the New South Wales Rugby League under-18s competition S. G. Ball Cup. Melbourne would play most of their home games at their training venue Princes Park in Carlton.

Coached by club high performance manager Kim Williams, the team would again make the finals, finishing the regular season in sixth position on the ladder with seven wins from nine matches. Melbourne would lose an elimination final against third-placed Parramatta 70–12 to end their season.

Awards

Melbourne Storm Awards Night
 Melbourne Storm Player of the Year: Ryan Hinchcliffe 
 Member's Player of the Year: Cooper Cronk
 Best Forward: Cameron Smith
 Best Back: Cooper Cronk
 Most Improved: Dane Neilsen
 Melbourne Storm Rookie of the Year: Matt Duffie
 Best Try: Matt Duffie – Round 15 vs North Queensland Cowboys
 NSW Cup Player of the Year: Jesse Bromwich
 Darren Bell U20s Player of the Year Award: Tohu Harris
 U20s Most Improved: Jarome Wilson
 U20s Best Forward: Kenny Bromwich
 U20s Best Back: Kirisome Auva'a
 Greg Brentnall Trophy (Young Achievers Award): Richard Kennar
 Mick Moore Club Person of the Year: Craig Bellamy
 Life Member Inductees: Craig Bellamy & Stephen Kearney

Dally M Awards Night
Dally M Rep Player of the Year: Billy Slater

Additional Awards
 New Zealand Kiwis Junior Player of the Year: Matt Duffie
 Wally Lewis Medal: Billy Slater

Notes

References

Melbourne Storm seasons
Melbourne Storm season